The Moscow Literary Sreda was a Moscow literary group founded in 1899 by Nikolai Teleshov. The name Sreda means Wednesday, taken from the day of the week on which writers and other artists met at Teleshov's home. The last meeting of the Sreda took place in 1916.

List of Sreda members
Leonid Andreyev 
Pyotr Boborykin
Ivan Bunin
Fyodor Chaliapin 
Anton Chekhov (Visitor)
Evgeny Chirikov
Sergey Elpatyevsky
Nikolai Garin-Mikhailovsky (Visitor)
Maxim Gorky
Evgeny Goslavsky
Sergey Gusev-Orenburgsky
Aleksandr Kuprin 
Vladimir Korolenko (Visitor)
Isaac Levitan
Dmitry Mamin-Sibiryak 
Sergey Terentyevich Semyonov
Alexander Serafimovich
Ivan Shmelyov
Stepan Skitalets
Fyodor Sologub (Visitor)
Nikolai Teleshov
Viktor Vasnetsov
Vikenty Veresaev
Semyon Yushkevich
Boris Zaytsev
Nikolai Zlatovratsky

See also
Znanie Publishers

References

 

Writing circles
Literary circles
Russian short story writers
Russian writers
Russian artists
Russian literary societies